42nd Regional Support Group is a Regional Support Group of the New Jersey Army National Guard.

Structure
117th Combat Sustainment Support Battalion at Woodbridge
143d Transportation Company
508th Military Police Company at Teaneck
50th Chemical Company at Somerset
119th Combat Sustainment Support Battalion at Vineland
253d Transportation Company at Cape May
 Detachment 1 at Atlantic City
328th Military Police Company at Cherry Hill
154th Quartermaster Company (Water Purification) at New Egypt
820th Quartermaster Detachment (Water Distribution) at New Egypt
50th Finance Management Company at Somerset (New Brunswick)
250th Finance Detachment at Somerset (New Brunswick)
350th Finance Detachment at Somerset (New Brunswick)

References

Military units and formations in New Jersey